Eric Richmond Cutler (born 1900) was an English footballer who played in the Football League for Wolverhampton Wanderers.

References

1900 births
Year of death missing
English footballers
Association football forwards
English Football League players
Wolverhampton Wanderers F.C. players